The General Federation of Nepalese Trade Unions (GEFONT) is a confederation of 20 national trade union federations. It is politically tied to the Communist Party of Nepal (Unified Marxist–Leninist). GEFONT declares its goal to be "Socialism for the dignified working-class and prosperous life".

Trade Unions have existed in Nepal since the All Nepal Trade Union Congress was formed in 1946, but only really came into power after the collapse of the Rana dynasty in 1951 and the movement towards democracy. GEFONT itself was established in 1989 by the Nepal Independent Workers Union, the Independent Transport Workers Association of Nepal, the Nepal Independent Hotel Workers Union, and the Trekking Workers Association of Nepal. At the time of its foundation, it functioned as the trade union wing of the then underground  Communist Party of Nepal (Marxist-Leninist).

The federation played an active role in the 1990 Jana Andolan. When CPN(ML) merged with the Communist Party of Nepal (Marxist) to form CPN(UML), the trade union of CPN(M), Nepal Trade Union Centre, merged into GEFONT.

It currently operates a GEFONT women's committee which is dedicated to the task of improving women's rights in the workplace in Nepal. Similarly, GEFONT youth committee also established to bring youth in the leadership of it rank and file.

GEFONT supported the 2006 democracy movement (Loktantra Andolan) and subsequently, four representatives were elected in the 2008 Constituent Assembly election and three elected in the 2013 elections.

See also 

 Integrated Centre of Trade Unions, Nepal

References

Communist Party of Nepal (Unified Marxist–Leninist)
National trade union centers of Nepal
Trade unions established in 1989
1989 establishments in Nepal